Filip Bergmark (born April 29, 1995) is a Swedish ice hockey defenceman. He is currently playing with Örebro HK of the Swedish Hockey League (SHL).

Bergmark made his Swedish Hockey League debut playing with Örebro HK during the 2014–15 SHL season.

References

External links

1995 births
Living people
Örebro HK players
Swedish ice hockey defencemen